Some People With Jokes is a BBC Four comedy series where members of the public tell jokes, first broadcast in 2013 and 2014. The programme is billed with a different title for each episode. It is based on the format of the earlier BBC Four series Old Jews Telling Jokes,

Episodes
The episodes are:
Series 1: Some Vicars With Jokes (two episodes); Some Boffins With Jokes; Some Scousers With Jokes (two episodes).
Series 2: Some Football Managers With Jokes; Some Irish People With Jokes; Some Funeral Directors with Jokes; Some Dog Owners with Jokes.
Christmas Special: Some Santas With Jokes.

References

External links
 

2013 British television series debuts
2010s British comedy television series
BBC television comedy
English-language television shows